This is a list of public art in Hanover, in Germany. This list applies only to works of public art accessible in an outdoor public space. For example, this does not include artwork  visible inside a museum.

References

Hannover